The 1922 United States Senate election in Michigan was held on November 7, 1922.

Incumbent Republican Senator Charles E. Townsend ran for re-election to a third term in office, but was defeated by Democratic former Governor Woodbridge N. Ferris. Ferris was the first Democrat popularly elected to represent Michigan in the Senate, after the Seventeenth Amendment was ratified just nine years prior.

General election

Candidates
Woodbridge N. Ferris, former Governor of Michigan (1913–17) (Democratic)
William L. Kreighoff (Socialist)
Frank E. Titus (Prohibition)
Charles E. Townsend, incumbent Senator since 1911 (Republican)

Results

See also 
 1922 United States Senate elections

References 

1922
Michigan
United States Senate